The women's 500 metres competition in short track speed skating at the 2022 Winter Olympics was held on 5 February (heats) and 7 February (finals), at the Capital Indoor Stadium in Beijing. Arianna Fontana of Italy won the event, replicating her success in 2018. Suzanne Schulting of the Netherlands took the silver, setting the Olympic record in one of the heats, and Kim Boutin of Canada won the bronze.

The defending champion was Fontana. The silver medalist, Yara van Kerkhof, and the bronze medalist, Boutin, who was also the world record holder, qualified as well. Van Kerkhof, however, was not selected to skate this distance. Schulting was the 2021 World Short Track Speed Skating champion at all distances, including 1500 m. Fontana and Selma Poutsma were the silver and bronze medalists, respectively. Many top athletes did not participate in the championship, however. Fontana was leading the 2021–22 ISU Short Track Speed Skating World Cup at the 500 m distance with four races completed before the Olympics, followed by Boutin and Natalia Maliszewska. Maliszewska was not allowed to compete as she tested positive for COVID-19 shortly after her arrival in Beijing.

Qualification

Countries were assigned quotas based on their performance during the 2021–22 ISU Short Track Speed Skating World Cup, with the top 32 athletes (maximum of three per country qualifying quotas. If a NOC declined a quota spot, it was distributed to the next available athlete, only if the maximum quota of 56 athletes per gender was not surpassed.

Records
Prior to this competition, the existing world and Olympic records were as follows.

A new Olympic record was set during the competition.

Results

Heats

Quarterfinals

Semifinals

Finals

Final B

Final A

References

Women's short track speed skating at the 2022 Winter Olympics